Yeyenwu is a cave in Hiw, the northernmost island of Vanuatu. It has some notable stalactite formations.

In the local language, the name Yöyen Wu  translates as "the cave of Spirits".

References

Caves of Vanuatu
Hiw Island